Mohammed Khader (born 6 November 1987) is an Indian cricketer. He made his first-class debut for Hyderabad in the 2007–08 Ranji Trophy on 15 November 2007.

References

External links
 

1987 births
Living people
Indian cricketers
Hyderabad cricketers
People from Hyderabad district, India